Annea Lockwood (born July 29, 1939, in Christchurch, New Zealand) is a New Zealand-born American composer and academic musician. She taught electronic music at Vassar College. Her range is vast and often includes microtonal, electro-acoustic soundscapes and vocal music, as well as recordings of natural found sounds. She has also recorded Fluxus-inspired pieces involving burning or drowning pianos.

Early life and education
Lockwood studied composition and completed a Bachelor of Music with honours from the University of Canterbury. Her composition studies continued with Peter Racine Fricker at the Royal College of Music from 1961-1963; with Gottfried Michael Koenig at the Darmstädter Ferienkurse from 1963-1964; and at the Hochschule für Musik Köln. She also studied in the Netherlands. Lockwood settled in London in 1964.

Career and style
During the late 1960s and early 1970s, Lockwood performed and composed around Europe. Her compositions featured non-conventional instruments such as glass tubing used in The Glass Concert (1967). This was published in Source: Music of the Avant Garde then recorded and released by Tangent Records. Her series Piano Transplants utilized burning, drowning, or planting pianos in locations across the United Kingdom and United States. In the 1970s, Lockwood began to compose music that could be classified as performance art pieces, as the essence of the compositional ideas made the audience and environment agents in one piece. She collaborated with various choreographers, sound poets, and visual artists.

In 1973, Lockwood relocated to New York City after being offered a faculty role at Hunter College. She worked with environmental sounds, capturing them and building developed compositions around an environmental inspiration, as in A Sound Map of the Hudson River (1982) and World Rhythms (1975). She also built on the archetypes and conversations with significant people, as in Conversations with the Ancestors (1979), composed on conversations with four women in their 80s; and Delta Run (1982) based on a conversation with sculptor Walter Wincha. Three Short Stories and Apotheosis (1985) used what Lockwood named the Soundball, which was a foam-covered ball made of six small speakers and a radio receiver. The impetus for this unusual piece of equipment was to "put sound into the hands of the dancers." She also works with the sounds of water.

In the 1990s, her pieces were written for acoustic-electric instruments and incorporated multi-media and indigenous instruments. Thousand Year Dreaming (1991) used four didgeridoos and blends images of the Lascaux Cave as part of the performance. In 2002, she began working on A Sound Map of the Danube River, which gathered sounds recorded from a variety of sites on the surface of, within, and around the river.

Lockwood's work has been presented at festivals around the world. Her piece Piano Burning has been replicated multiple times, including as the closing track of the 2019 album There Existed An Addiction To Blood by the experimental hip-hop group clipping. She has received the Henry Cowell Award (2007) and was featured in the short documentary Annea Lockwood / a Film About Listening (2021) and live documentary 32 Sounds (2022), both directed by Sam Green. Her recordings are currently distributed by Lovely, XI, ?What Next?/OO Discs, Rattle Records (NZ), Harmonia Mundi, Earth Ear, CRI, and Finnadar/Atlantic.

Lockwood is an Emeritus professor at Vassar College, where she has worked since 1982. Former students include Jonathan Elliott.

Discography
 1970: The Glass World of Anna Lockwood
 1977: Tiger Balm Opus One Records 70
 1977: Women in Electronic Music: New Music for Electronic & Recorded Media
 1989: A Sound Map of the Hudson River, Lovely Music, Ltd. CD 2081
 1990: Nautilus on The Aerial: Issue #2
 1991: Night and Fog on Full Spectrum Voice, Lovely Music, Ltd. CD 3021; features Thomas Buckner, baritone
 1991: Red Mesa Opus One Records 00152; features Loretta Goldberg, keyboards
 1993: Thousand Year Dreaming, Nonsequitur/?What Next? WN 0010 & O.O. Discs 0041
 1994: The Angle of Repose (on Sign of the Times), Lovely Music, Ltd. CD 3022; features Thomas Buckner, baritone
 1994: Sign Of The Times
 1996: Ear-Walking Woman
 1997: The Glass World, Nonsequitur/?What Next? WN 0021 & O.O. Discs
 1998: World Rhythms (on Sinopah), Experimental Intermedia XI 118; includes Ruth Anderson's I Come Out of Your Sleep
 1999: Breaking the Surface, Lovely Music, Ltd. CD 2082
 2003: 60x60, Capstone Records CPS-8744
 2007: Thousand Year Dreaming/Floating World, Pogus 21045–2

Reviews and articles
 1995, May 23: MUSIC REVIEW; Bang on a Can Uptown Cultivates Crossover by Allan Kozinn, The New York Times
 1989, December 10: Review/Music; Electronic Components In Work by 3 Composers by John Rockwell, The New York Times
 1993, April 20: Classical Music in Review by Bernard Holland, The New York Times
 2000, January 9: It's Sound, It's Art, and Some Call It Music by Kyle Gann, The New York Times
 2000, July 9: MUSIC; Electronic Music, Always Current by Kyle Gann, The New York Times
 2001, January 18: Art From a River's Past (and Its Present) by Dinitia Smith, The New York Times
 2003, March 9: ENVIRONMENT; Inside, An Echo Of a River  by James Gorman, The New York Times
 2004, October 16: MUSIC REVIEW | SOUNDS LIKE NOW, A 'Bring Your Own Improvisation' Party by Allan Kozinn, The New York Times
 2019, November 8: MUSIC; Burning Pianos and Whispering Rivers: A Composer’s Journey by Kerry O'Brien, The New York Times

References

External links
Otherminds.org
Lovely Music Artist: Annea Lockwood
I Resound Press
Annea Lockwood/A Film About Listening

1939 births
Living people
20th-century classical composers
21st-century classical composers
American women classical composers
American classical composers
American lesbian musicians
New Zealand emigrants to the United States
LGBT classical composers
New Zealand LGBT musicians
University of Canterbury alumni
Vassar College faculty
People from Christchurch
Women in electronic music
21st-century American composers
20th-century American women musicians
20th-century American composers
21st-century American women musicians
20th-century women composers
21st-century women composers
American women academics
20th-century LGBT people
21st-century LGBT people